Reda Pieleszewo railway station is a railway station serving the town of Reda, in the Pomeranian Voivodeship, Poland. The station is located on the Gdańsk–Stargard railway. The train services are operated by SKM Tricity.

Train services
The station is served by the following service(s):

Szybka Kolej Miejska services (SKM) (Lębork -) Wejherowo - Reda - Rumia - Gdynia - Sopot - Gdansk

References 

 This article is based upon a translation of the Polish language version as of October 2016.

External links

Railway stations served by Szybka Kolej Miejska (Tricity)
Wejherowo County